Love in the Dark may refer to:

Film
Love in the Dark (film), a 1922 American silent film
Love in the Dark, a 1985 South Korean film featuring Kim Hae-sook

Literature
Love in the Dark (play), a 1675 play by Francis Fane
Love in the Dark, a 1979 novel by Barbara Cartland
Love in the Dark, a 1986 novel by Charlotte Lamb
"Love in the Dark", a short story by H. L. Gold

Music
"Love in the Dark" (Adele song), 2015
"Love in the Dark", a song by Jessie Reyez from Before Love Came to Kill Us, 2020
"Love in the Dark", a song by the Twins, 1985
"Love in the Dark", a song by Yacht from Shangri-La, 2011